Eduardo Priggione (born 23 March 1934) is a Uruguayan former swimmer. He competed in two events at the 1952 Summer Olympics.

References

1934 births
Living people
Uruguayan male swimmers
Olympic swimmers of Uruguay
Swimmers at the 1952 Summer Olympics
Sportspeople from Montevideo